"Reminiscing" is a song by Australian soft rock music group Little River Band, released in June 1978 as the second single from their fourth studio album Sleeper Catcher. The song was written by the band's guitarist, Graeham Goble, and sung by their lead singer, Glenn Shorrock. "Reminiscing" peaked at number 35 on the Australian Kent Music Report and at No. 3 on the Billboard Hot 100.

At the Australian 1978 King of Pop Awards, the song won Australian Record of the Year.

"Reminiscing" was given a BMI Five Million-Air award for five million plays on US radio—the highest achievement ever for any Australian popular song.

According to Albert Goldman's biography, John Lennon named "Reminiscing" as one of his favourite songs. May Pang, erstwhile girlfriend of Lennon, said "Oddly, with all the fantastic music he wrote, "our song" was 'Reminiscing' by the Little River Band."

Background and recording
In 2005, Goble spoke of his inspiration and recording of the song, saying "I loved watching old black and white movies, and I always also loved the music of Glenn Miller and Cole Porter, that whole era of writing, and it was my attempt to write a song to depict the romantic era. It came out very quickly, I wrote it in about half an hour. Even though a lot of people think it sounds complicated, on the guitar it's very simple to play. It nearly never got recorded – when the time came to record it, the keyboard player I wanted to use, Peter Jones, was out of town, so we cut the band track with a different keyboard player. It didn't work. A few days later when we tried it again with a different keyboard player, again it didn't work, and the band was losing interest in the song. Just before the album was finished, Peter Jones came back into town, the band and I had an argument because I wanted to give Reminiscing a third chance. Peter played on it, we cut it, and finished it, and sent the album to Capitol. Capitol said that they couldn't hear any singles on the album, and didn't know what to release. Five weeks later, someone at Capitol's New York office said 'You're all crazy, Reminiscing is a smash.' Capitol put it out, and it just immediately caught on fire, and became our highest chart hit." Goble added "It's quite staggering; you don't realise you've written something like that until it happens, until it's history."

Record World called it "a highly danceable ballad" and praised the lead vocal performance.

Track listings
 Australian 7" (EMI 11738)
A. "Reminiscing" - 4:11
B. "Take Me Home" (Recorded Live at The Rainbow Theatre, London)

 New Zealand 7" (EMI 1043)
A. "Reminiscing" - 3:26	
B. "So Many Paths" - 4:22	

 North American 7" (Harvest 4605)
A. "Reminiscing" - 3:26	
B. "So Many Paths" - 4:22

Chart performance

Weekly charts

Year-end charts

Madison Avenue version

Australian band Madison Avenue covered the song  and released it as a single in March 2001. Their version was certified Gold by ARIA.

Track listing
Australian CD single
 "Reminiscing (Da Classic Remix - Edit)" – 3:31
 "Reminiscing (Original Mix - Edit)" – 3:24
 "Everything You Need (Olav Basoski Remix)" – 7:32
 "Reminiscing (Da Classic Remix)" – 5:06
 "It's Alright (Album Mix)" – 5:12

Charts

Year-end charts

Certifications

Other cover versions
 In July 1978, Shorrock recorded a Spanish-language version of the song, titled "Recordando", using the original backing track and backing vocals.

 Thumbs Carllile recorded a jazz cover on his 1979 album Guitar Wizard.

 Barry Manilow covered the song for his 1996 album Summer of '78.

 Tommy Emmanuel's covered the song for his 1998 album Collaboration featuring Shorrock. 

 Goble, Shorrock and Beeb Birtles, three of the original members of Little River Band, who reformed under the name Birtles Shorrock Goble, recorded "Reminiscing" for their 2003 CD and DVD  Full Circle.

 Carl Riseley included a jazz cover of the song on his 2008 album The Rise.

 k.d. lang recorded the song for the Australian version of her 2011 album Sing It Loud.

 Little River Band, now with lead singer Wayne Nelson, re-recorded the song for their 2016 album The Hits - Revisited.

 Shorrock rerecorded "Reminiscing" for his 2019 album Glenn Shorrock Sings Little River Band.

Samples
Biz Markie sampled the song for his song "Throwback" on the album Weekend Warrior.

In popular culture
 During American Idol'''s 2007 broadcast of Idol Gives Back, Ben Stiller jokingly threatened to sing the song nonstop until $200 billion in donations was achieved.
 The song is featured in the Freaks and Geeks episode "Kim Kelly Is My Friend."
 The song is featured in the film Monsters vs. Aliens.
 The song is heard playing in the background during a scene in Knocked Up with Seth Rogen and Paul Rudd at a Las Vegas hotel room.
 The song was used in the 2010 film The Other Guys.
 The song was used in the episode of The Middle titled Taking Back The House. The song is featured in the HBO series Divorce''.
 The song was used as a bumper for Tom Hatten's Family Film Festival.

References

Little River Band songs
1978 songs
1978 singles
2001 singles
APRA Award winners
Madison Avenue (band) songs
Barry Manilow songs
Song recordings produced by John Boylan (record producer)
EMI Records singles
Harvest Records singles
Songs written by Graeham Goble
Songs about nostalgia